Lemyra flammeola is a moth of the family Erebidae. It was described by Frederic Moore in 1877. It is found in China (Jiangxi, Zhejiang, Shandong, Fujian, Hunan, Sichuan, Yunnan).

Subspecies
Lemyra flammeola flammeola (Shandong, Zhejiang, Fujian, Yunnan)
Lemyra flammeola hunana (Daniel, 1943) (Hunan)

References

 

flammeola
Moths described in 1877